The 2009 Cheltenham Gold Cup was a horse race which took place at Cheltenham on Friday March 13, 2009. It was the 81st running of the Cheltenham Gold Cup, and it was won by the pre-race favourite Kauto Star. The winner was ridden by Ruby Walsh and trained by Paul Nicholls.

Kauto Star became the first horse to regain the Gold Cup in the event's history. He had previously won it in 2007, and he was runner-up in 2008. The winning margin of thirteen lengths was the widest in the race since 1995.

Race details
 Sponsor: Totesport
 Winner's prize money: £270,797.50
 Going: Good to Soft
 Number of runners: 16
 Winner's time: 6m 44.95s

Full result

* The distances between the horses are shown in lengths or shorter. nk = neck; PU = pulled-up.† All trainers are based in Great Britain.

Winner's details
Further details of the winner, Kauto Star:

 Foaled: March 19, 2000 in France
 Sire: Village Star; Dam: Kauto Relka (Port Etienne)
 Owner: Clive D. Smith
 Breeder: Marie-Louise Aubert

References
 
 sportinglife.com
 guardian.co.uk – "Kauto Star regains Gold Cup in splendid isolation" – March 13, 2009.

Cheltenham Gold Cup
 2009
Cheltenham Gold Cup
Cheltenham Gold Cup
2000s in Gloucestershire